Sarah Banks may refer to:

 Sarah Sophia Banks (1744–1818), English collector of antiquarian items and sister of the naturalist Joseph Banks
 Sarah Banks (Brookside), fictional character from the soap opera Brookside